WTBN (570 AM) is a commercial radio station licensed to Pinellas Park, Florida and serving the Tampa Bay area.  The station is owned by Salem Media Group and it airs a religious radio format.  Most of the schedule is made up of brokered programming where national religious leaders pay Salem Communications for 15 and 30-minute time blocks.  Hosts include Dr. Charles Stanley, Jim Daly, David Jeremiah, Joni Eareckson Tada and John MacArthur.

WTBN's programming is simulcast on WTWD (910 AM) in Plant City, Florida, serving the eastern portion of the Tampa Bay radio market, and on WLCC (760 AM) in Brandon, Florida.  WTBN operates with 250 watts day and 730 watts night, WTWD operates with 5,000 watts day and night, and WLCC operates with 10,000 watts day and 1,000 watts night.  All stations use two directional antenna patterns.  WTBN's transmitter is off Tower Way in Land o' Lakes, Florida.  WTWD's transmitter is off Sidney-Dover Road in Dover.  The studios and offices for both stations are on West Laurel Street in Tampa.

History

WFSO
This station began operations on March 12, 1966, as WFSO, a daytime-only station, broadcasting at 500 watts.  For most of its early years, it was owned by the Pinellas Broadcasting Corporation, broadcasting a blend of album rock and Top 40 music. On June 17, 1978 at 8:30 pm, the station commenced nighttime transmissions, commencing 24/7 operations.

WPLP

In 1978, it was acquired by International Broadcasters, Inc. and became Tampa Bay's first full-time news/talk station as WPLP.  The new owners, in addition to changing the format and call sign, also boosted the power to 1,000 watts, around the clock. The station affiliated with CBS Radio News and the Mutual Broadcasting System, carrying the syndicated Larry King Show overnight.

In 1984, WPLP was bought by Guy Gannett Communications, which owned radio stations, TV stations and newspapers around the country. Gannett kept the news/talk format in place for the four years it owned WPLP.

WTKN
In March 1988, Susquehanna Broadcasting acquired WPLP in a station swap with Guy Gannett. They immediately applied for new call letters, a month later rebranding as WTKN — standing for "Now We're TalKiN," the station's new tag line. However, the station quickly lost its until-then-competitive ratings; in its first full Arbitron period, Summer 1988, WTKN achieved a 0.2 overall market share.

WHNZ
In 1991, the station was acquired by Paxson Broadcasting, a company started by Florida multi-millionaire Bud Paxson after he sold the Home Shopping Network. Paxson switched the format to Business News and Talk, changing the call letters to WHNZ for "Wins Radio," implying that if you listened to the station, you'd win at business.

In 1998, Clear Channel Communications bought WHNZ in anticipation of a three-way frequency swap, also involving WSAA (620 AM) and WDAE (1250 AM). On January 1, 2000, Clear Channel changed WSAA's call sign to WDAE, picking up the all-sports format heard on the previous WDAE; the previous WDAE took the WHNZ call sign and business talk format heard on the previous WHNZ; with the previous WHNZ adopting the WTBN call sign, standing for Tampa Bay News, and picking up a talk radio format.

WTBN and WTWD
By the following year, Salem Communications had bought the station, keeping the WTBN call letters but switching the format to Christian radio,. In July 2000, Salem had also bought AM 910 in Plant City, which had been running its own sports talk format.  Salem's religious format had begun on WTWD several months before it debuted on WTBN.

WTWD first signed on in July 1949.  At the time, it was WPLA, broadcasting at 1570 kHz, powered at 500 watts, on the air days only.   By the 1960s, it had moved to its current dial position at 910 kHz, with 1000 watts, but still as a daytimer, playing country music.  By the 1980s, the station had gotten nighttime authorization, also at 1,000 watts.  In the 1990s, it was sports talk WFNS, boosted to 5,000 watts fulltime, before it was bought by Salem and converted to Christian radio, in 2000.

WTBN and WTWD previously broadcast two shows hosted by Gary Gauthier, It's God's Money and All About Florida Real Estate, until Gauthier was arrested in January 2014 for running a Ponzi scheme from 2005 until 2010, which allegedly allowed Gauthier and a partner to bilk $6 million from the retirement savings of at least 38 people.

References

External links

 
 

TBN
Radio stations established in 1966
TBN
Salem Media Group properties
1966 establishments in Florida